In control system theory, the Liénard–Chipart criterion is a stability criterion modified from the Routh–Hurwitz stability criterion, proposed by A. Liénard and M. H. Chipart. This criterion has a computational advantage over the Routh–Hurwitz criterion because it involves only about half the number of determinant computations.

Algorithm 

The Routh–Hurwitz stability criterion says that a necessary and sufficient condition for all the roots of the polynomial with real coefficients

to have negative real parts (i.e.  is Hurwitz stable) is that

Using the same notation as above, the Liénard–Chipart criterion is that  is Hurwitz stable if and only if any one of the four conditions is satisfied:
 
 
 
 

Hence one can see that by choosing one of these conditions, the number of determinants required to be evaluated is reduced.

Alternatively Fuller formulated this as follows for (noticing that  is never needed to be checked):

 

 

References

External links 

 

Stability theory